Tylen Jacob Williams (born December 8, 2001) is an American actor. He is known for his role as James Phillips in the Nick at Nite television comedy series Instant Mom.

Early life
Williams was born in Westchester County, New York. His mother, Angela Williams, is a singer-songwriter and his father, Le'Roy Williams, is a police sergeant. Williams also has two older brothers, Tyler James Williams and Tyrel Jackson Williams both of whom are also actors.

Career
Williams began acting at the age of four as a younger version of Drew from the TV series Everybody Hates Chris. Williams also appeared in TV shows such as Without a Trace and Parks and Recreation.
In 2013, Williams was cast as James Phillips, the prankster of the family, in the Nick at Nite series Instant Mom. In 2017 he portrayed Jordan Cavanaugh, the son of Detective Tommy Cavanaugh in Wisdom of the Crowd (Season 1 episode 7).

Filmography

References

External links
 

2001 births
Living people
American male television actors
American male child actors
African-American male actors
People from Westchester County, New York
21st-century American male actors
21st-century African-American people